Mariam El-Masri (born 20 June 1991) is a footballer who plays as a midfielder. Born in Canada, she represents Guyana internationally.

Early and personal life
She was born in Scarborough, Ontario to a Tunisian father and a Guyanese mother. She played youth soccer with Wexford SC in Scarborough. Her older brother Sherif is also a footballer who represented Canada U23 internationally. She is an alumnus of Agincourt Collegiate Institute, in Scarborough, Ontario. In 2011, she attended Centennial College and played for the women's team.

Playing career
She won the 2012 Ontario Women Soccer League with GS (Gursikh Sabha) United before signing on with Boldklubben 1921 in Denmark.

El-Masri made Guyana's first-ever goal in the CONCACAF Women's Championship in 2010, then Guyana's first-ever goal in the CONCACAF Women's Olympic Qualifying Championship in 2016.

In 2015, she attended Seneca College, playing for their women's team.

She sustained a severe concussion and took a break from football, but returned to join GS United in Toronto, winning the Ontario Championships and coming in third in the Canadian National Championships.

International goals
Scores and results list Guyana's goal tally first

See also
List of Guyana women's international footballers

References

External links 
 

1991 births
Living people
Citizens of Guyana through descent
Guyanese women's footballers
Women's association football midfielders
Warriors FC players
Guyana women's international footballers
Guyanese expatriate footballers
Guyanese expatriate sportspeople in Singapore
Expatriate footballers in Singapore
Guyanese people of Tunisian descent
Sportspeople from Scarborough, Toronto
Soccer players from Toronto
Canadian women's soccer players
Canadian expatriate women's soccer players
Canadian expatriate sportspeople in Singapore
Canadian people of Tunisian descent
Canadian sportspeople of Guyanese descent
Seneca College alumni